Isabelle Clark Percy West (1882–1976) was an American artist, designer and educator based in California known for landscape paintings, early Pacific Coast etching and her role in the founding faculty of California College of the Arts.

Early life and education
Isabelle Clark Percy was born on November 6, 1882, in Alameda, California. Her father was George W. Percy a San Francisco architect.

Percy West studied at the Mark Hopkins Institute of Art, formerly the California School of Design and later SFAI, in San Francisco. She went on to attend Columbia University, where she studied under Arthur Wesley Dow She graduated from the Art Department of Teachers College, Columbia University in 1907.

Isabelle Clark Percy married George West, a newspaperman, in 1916.

Work

In the teens, when "On the Pacific Coast, the profession being in its infancy...there are many encouraging creditable productions that command favorable consideration, among them...Helen Hyde and Isabelle Percy with their pictorial colored prints" Isabelle Percy was recognized for her etchings

Awards
In 1915 Percy won a bronze medal for her lithographic print at the Panama Pacific International Exposition in San Francisco.

Collections
Percy West's work is held in many permanent collections including:
 Mills College Art Museum, Oakland, CA

Selected exhibitions

Percy West's work was featured in the 2020 Saint Mary's College Museum of Art exhibit Feminizing Permanence

In 1928 Percy West's paintings of landscapes and Hawaiian flowers were featured in an exhibit of Hawaiian Paintings at The Academy of Arts, Honolulu, now the Honolulu Museum of Art

In 1915 her lithography work was included in the Panama Pacific International Exposition in San Francisco.

Percy West exhibited nationally in San Francisco, Philadelphia, Chicago, Hawaii and New York as well as internationally in Paris and Germany.

Teaching

In 1925, when the California School of Arts and Crafts completed its move from Berkeley to a new Oakland campus at the corner of Broadway and College Avenue, West made the move as well and was named as one of "the school's faculty of highly trained specialists" in the Western Journal of Education.

Legacy
In 1968 The Isabelle Percy West Gallery was completed in the topmost level of Founders Hall which was built on the Oakland campus of California College of Arts and Crafts to honor founding faculty of the college.

References

External links 
Isabelle Percy West with CCA Founder, Frederick Meyer

1882 births
1976 deaths
American women painters
American women printmakers
American etchers
Painters from California
Artists from the San Francisco Bay Area
San Francisco Art Institute alumni
Teachers College, Columbia University alumni
California College of the Arts faculty
20th-century American painters
People from Alameda, California
20th-century American women artists
American women academics